White Mischief is a steampunk-themed indoor festival, first organized in London in 2007.

Around the World in 80 Days 

White Mischief's 2008 event was held at the Scala nightclub in London. Performers included:

 Oojami, a global band who combine Turkish influences with London beats and Sufi dancers;
 Tough Love, co-founders and hosts of White Mischief, this six-piece pop band blends tribal, world-influenced drums and percussion with quirky, acerbic English lyrics;
 Hooligan Night, formed in 2006 when production maestro Nik Diezel met apocalyptic pin-up Ruby Blues, one of the superstars of the London neo-burlesque scene;
 Aste Amundsen, the artist behind The Apocalypse Gameshow;
 The Penny Dreadfuls, a Neo-Victorian comedy troupe;
 Miss Behave
 Ebony Bones
 The Outside Royalty, a six-piece "electro chamber rock" band ;
 Tricity Vogue, a vintage Jazz singer;
 Dusty Limits
 Ophelia Bitz
 Seffi, Snake Charmer
 Ta Mere
 Todd Hart
 Scratchy
 Lady Kamikaze 
 The Men That Will Not Be Blamed for Nothing
 Dickon Edwards
 The Broken Hearts
 Sheriff Marshall Lawman and Theodora Goes Wild

References

External links
 White Mischief - Official website

Music festivals in London
2007 establishments in England
Music festivals established in 2007
Steampunk